Munizae Jahangir is a Pakistani journalist and filmmaker who currently hosts the current affairs program Spotlight on Aaj TV.

Early life and education
Jahangir was born in Pakistan to human rights activist Asma Jahangir and Tahir Jahangir.

Jahangir obtained her BA degree in Political science and English from McGill University in Montreal, Canada. Additionally, she has an MA in Media studies with a concentration in film and video from New School University, New York, USA.

Career

Journalism
Jahangir has reported on politics in Pakistan and has been vocal about the struggles of female journalists in Pakistan, and co-founded South-Asian Women in Media (SAWM) to address this issue. SAWM is an organization for and by female journalists that works to protect freedom of the press and promote increased presence as well as equal treatment of women in media. When interviewed by Maheen Irfan Ghani for Newsline Magazine in April 2012, Jahangir spoke openly and explicitly about her experiences with sexism in the media industry.

Filmmaking
In 2003, Jahangir produced and directed a feature length documentary about the lives of four Afghan women from the 1920s to the present day, throughout the turbulent history of Afghanistan. This documentary, called "Search for Freedom" was selected as one out of sixteen films screened by Amnesty International at their USA film festivals.

Jahangir co-produced a documentary on the street children of Lahore, which was then aired in community centres across Pakistan.

Jahangir was a research assistant and camera-person in the making of a documentary about women who were victims of Acid attacks. This documentary was aired on Indus Vision Television in Dubai, UAE.

Jahangir worked with Pakistani director, Samina Peerzada, to make Peerzada's sophomore directorial project "Shararat". This was a romantic comedy, released in 2003, with a less-than-successful in the Pakistani box office. However, songs from the soundtrack composed by the film's music director Wajahat Attrey were mega-hits in the country. Songs such as Jugnu'on Sey Bhar Ley Aancha, performed by Ali Zafar and Shabnam Majeed, with lyrics by Aqeel Ruby.

Human rights advocacy
Jahangir is on the board of Asma Jahangir Foundation, besides the AGHS Legal Aid Cell, where she provides legal aid to women, children, and marginalized communities free of charge.

She is an active member of the Human Rights Commission of Pakistan, like her mother before her.

Achievements and honours
In 2008, Jahangir was honored as a Young Global Leader by the World Economic Forum.

She accepted the United Nations Human Rights Prize for 2018 on her mother's behalf, dedicating the quinquennial award to Pakistani women and their courage.

References

Living people
McGill University alumni
The New School alumni
Pakistani women journalists
Pakistani television hosts
Pakistani women television presenters
Pakistani documentary filmmakers
Year of birth missing (living people)